Madeleine d'Arsant de Puisieux (1720–1798), was a French writer and active feminist.

Life 

Madeleine de Puisieux, was born in Paris on 28 November 1720. Although not much is known about her early life, Puisieux worked to become a published author. In 1745, she achieved her goal and with the help of her friend, Denis Diderot she published one of her first works entitled Les Caractères sometime in the year 1750.

In the year 1750, Madeleine de Puisieux met and fell in love with Philippe-Florent de Puisieux, a lawyer French ambassador to Switzerland and a well-known lawyer at the Paris parliament, eventually marrying him.

Madeleine de Puisieux had a longtime relationship with fellow philosopher, art critic, Denis Diderot from 1746 to 1755. Although never married, she was the kept woman to Diderot during their time together. In that time, they worked together on some of Puisieux's works, as he helped get the works published. The relationship was not exclusive and Diderot also had relationships with Sophie Volland, and Mme de Maux. Throughout her relationships, Puisieux had no children. 

On 12 April 1798, Madeleine de Puisieux died in her hometown in Paris at the age of 77 years old.

Achievements 

Puisieux published one of her most famous works in 1750 entitled, La Femme n'est pas inférieure à l'homme ("Woman is not inferior to man"). This was a publication of a previously anonymous piece where Puisieux translated and brought up topics in the book about the equality of sexes. She based these questions found in the 1405 publication, La Cité des dames (The City of ladies)  by Christine de Pisan. The following year, it was republished under the title Le Triomphe des dames (The Triumph of the ladies.) It is sometimes debated whether Puisieux's future husband Philippe-Florent de Puisieux (1713–1772) helped Puisieux with the translations used in the final publication.

She sought opportunities to help the younger generation of girls by publishing advice books for girls. This made her name a well-known one among the population as Puisieux wanted to encourage girls to know about gender equality with feminism as her platform of teaching.

With the wide known success of her works, Puisieux was recognized by Louis XV. After the death of Louis XV in 1774, she settled down with her husband and was awarded a state pension in 1795.

Works 
 Alzarac, ou La nécessité d'être inconstant, Cologne, Paris, Charpentier, 1762
 Conseils à une amie, Amsterdam, Aux dépens de la Compagnie, 1751
 Histoire de Mademoiselle de Terville, Amsterdam, Veuve Duchesne, 1768
 Le Goût de bien des gens, ou, Recueil de contes, tant en vers qu'en prose, Amsterdam, Changuion, 1769
 Le Plaisir et la volupté : conte allégorique, Paphos, [s.n.], 1752
 L'Éducation du marquis de *** ou Mémoires de la comtesse de Zurlac, Berlin, Fouché, 1753
 Les Caractères, Londres [Paris], S.n., 1750–1751
 Mémoires d'un Homme de Bien, Paris, Delalain, 1768
 Réflexions et avis sur les défauts et les ridicules a la mode. Pour servir de suite aux conseils à une amie, Paris, Brunet, 1761
 Zamor et Almanzine, ou L'inutilité de l'esprit et du bon sens, Amsterdam, Hochereau l'aîné, 1755

References 

18th-century French philosophers
1720 births
1798 deaths
French feminist writers
18th-century French writers
18th-century French women writers
Denis Diderot